Helsfyr is a residential and industrial neighborhood in Oslo. It is located in Oslo's East End, in the administrative borough of Gamle Oslo.

The neighborhood is named after Helsfyr gård, which name is possibly originating from Low Saxon helschvûr, "Hell-Fire". Helsfyr was sparsely populated until the 1950s, and was further developed in the 1980s.

Helsfyr station on the Oslo Metro first opened in 1966. A combined metro/bus terminal opened in 1993, making Helsfyr an important public transportation interchange in Oslo's East End.

References

External links

Neighbourhoods of Oslo
Gamle Oslo